is a Japanese professional racing cyclist, who currently rides for UCI Continental team . He rode at the 2015 UCI Track Cycling World Championships. In June 2015, he won the Japanese National Road Race Championships. He also competed at the 2014 Asian Games.

Major results

Road

2007
 1st Stage 9 Tour de l'Abitibi
 3rd Time trial, Asian Junior Road Championships
2012
 3rd Overall Tour de Hokkaido
 5th Time trial, National Road Championships
2013
 3rd Time trial, National Road Championships
 5th Overall Jelajah Malaysia
2014
 4th Overall Tour de Hokkaido
1st  Points classification
 9th Time trial, Asian Road Championships
2015
 National Road Championships
1st  Road race
4th Time trial
 9th Overall Tour de Hokkaido
2016
 8th Overall Tour of China II
2018
 1st  Time trial, National Road Championships
2019
 1st Stage 8 Tour of Japan
2022
 1st Stage 1 Tour de Kumano

Track

2011
 Asian Championships
3rd  Individual pursuit
3rd  Team pursuit
3rd  Madison
2012
 1st  Points race, National Championships
2013
 Asian Championships
2nd  Team pursuit
3rd  Omnium
2014
 1st  Omnium, National Championships
 3rd  Team pursuit, Asian Games
2015
 2nd  Team pursuit, Asian Championships
2016
 2nd  Team pursuit, Asian Championships
2018
 National Championships
1st  Team pursuit
1st  Individual pursuit
1st  Points race
1st  Madison (with Ryo Chikatani)
2019
 National Championships
1st  Team pursuit
1st  Individual pursuit
1st  Points race
1st  Madison (with Eiya Hashimoto)
 Asian Championships
2nd  Team pursuit
3rd  Madison (with Eiya Hashimoto)
2020
 Asian Championships
1st  Team pursuit
2nd  Madison (with Eiya Hashimoto)
2021
 UCI Champions League
2nd Scratch, London
 UCI Nations Cup, Hong Kong
3rd Scratch
3rd Team pursuit
2022
 Asian Championships
1st  Team pursuit
1st  Madison (with Shunsuke Imamura)
 National Championships
1st  Team pursuit
1st  Individual pursuit
1st  Omnium
1st  Madison (with Shunsuke Imamura)
2nd Scratch
3rd Points race
 2nd  Scratch, UCI World Championships
 2nd Madison (with Shunsuke Imamura), UCI Nations Cup, Glasgow

References

External links
 

1989 births
Living people
Japanese male cyclists
Asian Games medalists in cycling
Cyclists at the 2014 Asian Games
Medalists at the 2014 Asian Games
Asian Games bronze medalists for Japan
Olympic cyclists of Japan
Cyclists at the 2016 Summer Olympics
20th-century Japanese people
21st-century Japanese people
Japanese track cyclists
Sportspeople from Fukushima Prefecture